The 1943 Bristol Central by-election was a by-election held on 18 February 1943 for the British House of Commons constituency of Bristol Central in the city of Bristol.  The seat had become vacant when the constituency's Conservative Member of Parliament (MP) Lord Apsley had been killed on 17 December 1942, whilst on active service in World War II.  He had been serving under the Arab Legion in Malta.

The Conservative party selected as its candidate Violet Bathurst, Lady Apsley, who had married Lord Apsley in February 1942.  During World War II, the parties in the war-time Coalition Government had agreed not to contest any by-elections which occurred in seats held by coalition parties.  However other parties and independents were free to stand, and some local parties fielded their own candidates as "independents" despite the truce.  In Bristol Central, the former ILP MP Jennie Lee stood as an "Independent labour" candidate.  The current ILP General Secretary, John McNair, also stood.

On a turnout less than half that of the 1935 general election, Lady Apsley held the seat with a slightly increased majority.

Votes

See also 
 Bristol Central constituency
 Lists of United Kingdom by-elections

References 
 

1943 in England
1943 elections in the United Kingdom
Central
1940s in Bristol